Solwezi East is a constituency of the National Assembly of Zambia. It covers Mushindamo District of North-Western Province.

List of MPs

References

Constituencies of the National Assembly of Zambia
Constituencies established in 1973
1973 establishments in Zambia